A list of notable films produced in the Cinema of Spain, ordered by year of release in the 1940s. For an alphabetical list of articles on Spanish films, see :Category:Spanish films.

1940s

External links
 Spanish film at the Internet Movie Database

Lists of 1940s films
1940s
Films